Young-Sprinters Hockey Club is a Swiss professional ice hockey team based in Neuchâtel.

Founded: 1932
Home arena: Patinoire du Littoral (capacity 6,500)
Swiss Championships won: 0
Nationalliga B Championships won: 1 (1966)

External links
 Young-Sprinters official website

Ice hockey teams in Switzerland